The 1998 Biathlon Junior World Championships was held in Jericho, Vermont, USA and Valcartier, Canada from February 22 to March 1, 1998. There was to be a total of 8 competitions: sprint, individual, team and relay races for men and women.

Medal winners

Junior Women

Junior Men

Medal table

References 

 IBU Biathlon Guide

Biathlon Junior World Championships
1998 in biathlon
1998 in Canadian sports
1998 in American sports
International sports competitions hosted by Canada
1998 in youth sport